Kipkemoi is a surname of Kenyan origin meaning "born at night". Notable people with the surname include:

Gladys Kipkemoi (born 1986), Kenyan steeplechase runner
Joan Kipkemoi (born 1993), Kenyan long-distance runner
Kenneth Kipkemoi (born 1984), Kenyan long-distance runner

Kalenjin names